Secoisolariciresinol is an organic compound. It is classified as a lignan, i.e., a type of phenylpropanoid. It is present in some cereals, e.g. rye, and together with matairesinol, has attracted much attention for its beneficial nutritional effects.

Occurrence
The water extract of silver fir wood contains more than 5% of secoisolariciresinol. It is also present in nettle brew. Its content in flaxseed (Linum usitatıssimum) was found to be 0.3%, which is the highest known content in food.

Biomedical aspects
In the intestine the gut microflora can form secoisolariciresinol from the secoisolariciresinol diglucoside and it can then be further transformed into the enterolignan enterodiol. Epidemiological studies showed associations between secoisolariciresinol intake and decreased risk of cardiovascular disease are promising, but they are yet not well established, perhaps due to low lignan intakes in habitual Western diets. At the higher doses used in intervention studies, associations were more evident.

Glycosides
 Secoisolariciresinol diglucoside

References

Lignans
Phenol ethers
Primary alcohols